Enteromius litamba is a ray-finned fish species in the family Cyprinidae. It has long been placed in Barbus, the "wastebin genus" for barbs, by default, and this is still being done by the IUCN. However, the species is increasingly being restored by some taxonomists to the related yellowfish genus Labeobarbus, others place it in the genus Enteromius. 
It is presumably hexaploid like the other yellowfish.

Its natural habitats are rivers and freshwater lakes. It is endemic to Lake Malawi and its river mouths in Malawi, Mozambique and Tanzania.

E. litamba is a large species. This shoaling freshwater fish which prefers sandy substrates when young, while the adults occur in shoals in open waters in which they hunt search of food, although inshore waters are preferred. They are predators, eating mainly smaller fishes but also some insects (in particular when young). Its spawning grounds are not well known. But it is presumed that, like many of their relatives, they are at least somewhat potadromous and probably move from the lake into its tributary rivers to spawn.

This species is caught for food using scoop nets, but being not as abundant as other "barbs" of Lake Malawi, it is only of local importance. It is by no means rare however, and due to its wide range is not considered a threatened species by the IUCN. Overfishing may, like in all large fishes, easily become a problem though.

References

Enteromius
Taxa named by Ludwig Keilhack
Fish described in 1908
Taxonomy articles created by Polbot